The 2014 Men's European Water Polo Championship was held in Budapest from 14–27 July 2014.

Qualification

There were 12 teams in the 2014 championships. They qualified as follows:
 The host nation
 The best five teams from the 2012 European Championships not already qualified as the host nation
 six qualifiers

Championships
The structure of the championships is that there were two groups of six teams followed by a knockout phase. The first three teams in each group qualified to compete for the championship, with the first-place teams given a bye to the semifinals. The last three teams in each group played a classification tournament for 7th–12th place.

Squads

Draw
The draw was held on 9 March 2014.

Groups

Preliminary round
The schedule was announced on 10 May 2014.

Group A

Group B

Final round

Bracket

Quarterfinals

Semifinals

Fifth place game

Bronze medal game

Final

7th–12th Classification

Bracket

7th–12th Quarterfinals

7th–12th Semifinals

Eleventh place game

Ninth place game

Seventh place game

Statistics

Final ranking

Top goalscorers

Awards

References

External links

Official website

Men
Men's European Water Polo Championship
International water polo competitions hosted by Hungary
Men's European Water Polo Championship
Euro